Walter's Mill is a  tower mill at Mark Cross, Sussex, England which has been converted to residential accommodation.

History

Walter's Mill was first mentioned in 1845 and is thought to have been built by the Arnold brothers of Paddock Wood, Kent. The mill was working by wind until 26 July 1911, when it was burnt out. The mill was refitted and driven by a gas engine, at that time having a crenellated top, which was removed in the early 1930s. the mill building was converted and extended to form a house in 1962. In 2005, it was announced that the owners planned to rebuild the cap and sails, and return the mill to a more traditional appearance in the long term.

Description

Walter's Mill is a five-storey tile-hung brick tower mill. It had four Patent sails. The Kentish-style cap was winded by a fantail.  The mill drove two pairs of underdrift millstones. The converted tower stands today, with the window and door openings having been enlarged during the conversion.

Millers

Catherine Ashby 1845
Walter Dunk 1855 - 1856
Edward J Walter and Sons 1887
Edward and Joseph Walter 1903
Joseph Walter and Son 1905
Joseph Walter and Sons 1913
Wealden Farmers Ltd 1930s

References for above:-

References

External links
Windmill World webpage on Mark Cross mill.
Photograph of the mill on fire.
Photograph of the mill in 1936.

Further reading
 Online version

Windmills completed in 1845
Industrial buildings completed in 1845
Towers completed in the 19th century
Tower mills in the United Kingdom
Grinding mills in the United Kingdom
Windmills in East Sussex
Rotherfield